The Official Superhero Adventure Game is a role-playing game published by its designer Brian Phillips in 1981.

Description
The Official Superhero Adventure Game is a superhero system with rules mainly for combat (basic and advanced). The game includes dozens of hero and villain character descriptions. A calculator is required, as math formulas figure prominently in the rules.

Publication history
The Official Superhero Adventure Game was designed and published by Brian Phillips in 1981 as a 52-page book with a blue and white cover, and 32 cardstock sheets. A second version was published the same year with a color cover.

Reception
Lawrence Schick felt that the game system's rules were "confused" and "rudimentary".

Reviews
Different Worlds #23 (Aug 1982)

References

Role-playing games introduced in 1981
Superhero role-playing games